The Order of Bravery is a Bulgarian order which existed during the Kingdom of Bulgaria and currently exists in the Republic of Bulgaria. It was the second highest in the Kingdom of Bulgaria and is the fourth highest in the Republic of Bulgaria. It has existed since 1880 with an interruption between 1946 and 2003.

The Royal Order

The Order of Bravery was established with a decree of Knyaz Alexander Batenberg on 1 January 1880. It is the first Bulgarian order and was modeled after the Order of Military Merit of the Grand Duchy of Hesse which existed to 1866. The recipients of the order are called cavaliers. The order was one of the many violations of the Treaty of Berlin with which Bulgaria demonstrated full independence although the country was deprived of high state decorations - symbols of national independence.

The head of state and the heir to the throne were cavaliers by right to Military Order of Bravery I grade and Military Order of Bravery IV grade respectively. Due to his great respect to the order Tsar Boris III never put on the Order of Bravery I grade and the Grand cross but only the Order of Bravery III grade, 2nd class received during the First Balkan War (1912-1913); the Order of Bravery III grade, 1st class received during the First World War (1915-1918) and the Order of Bravery IV grade, 1st class which he received by right as an heir in 1894.

The order was first awarded on 17 April 1880 when 33 participants in the Russo-Turkish War (1877–1878) received the order. Several days later on 24 April (6 May NS, the Day of St George), the order was awarded for the first time to a civilian person.

Between 1937 and 1940, the sign of the Order of Bravery I grade, 1st class was used as a symbol of the Bulgarian Air Force in analogue with the Iron Cross which was the traditional symbol of the Luftwaffe. Several German officers received this award during World War II.

After the end of the monarchy the orders and the medals of the Kingdom of Bulgaria were fully substituted with other ones. On 15 September the Order of Bravery ceased to exist.

Description

Order of Bravery
Grand Cross of the Order of Bravery 
The Grand Cross was awarded only to the ruler who was a Grand Master of the order. It consisted of a necklace, a star and a mantle. 
There are five emissions.
Order of Bravery I grade, 1st class (until 1886 it was called Order of Bravery I grade)
There are four emissions.
Order of Bravery I grade, 2nd class (since 1886)
That order was awarded to Bulgarian and foreign generals and foreign rulers.
Second, third and fourth grade were given to generals and officers according to their rank. 
Order of Bravery II grade
There are two emissions.
Order of Bravery III grade, 1st class (until 1915 it was called Order of Bravery III grade)
There are three emissions.
Order of Bravery III grade, 2nd class (since 1915)
There are five emissions.
Order of Bravery IV grade, 1st class (until 1915 it was called Order of Bravery IV grade)
There are seven emissions.
Order of Bravery IV grade, 2nd class (since 1915)
There are ten emissions.

Soldier Cross of Bravery
The Soldier Cross of Bravery was a medal enlisted to the Order of Bravery. 
Soldier Cross of Bravery I grade 
Gold-plated, with crossed ribbons
Soldier Cross of Bravery II grade 
Gold-plated, without crossed ribbons
Soldier Cross of Bravery III grade 
Silver-plated, with crossed ribbons
Soldier Cross of Bravery IV grade 
Silver-plated, without crossed ribbons

Knights of the Order of Bravery I grade
In the Bulgarians history there are only three persons awarded with the Order of Bravery I grade: 
Stefan Stambolov - Bulgarian statesman, revolutionary, politician, poet and journalist.
Georgi Zhivkov - Bulgarian revolutionary and politician of the People's Liberal Party, three times chairman of the National Assembly, regent of Bulgaria after the abdication of Alexander I (1886-1887) and minister of enlightenment (1886, 1887-1893).
Major General Sava Mutkurov - regent of Bulgaria (1886–1887) and minister of defense in the government of Stefan Stambolov (1887–1893).

Monarchs:
Knyaz Alexander Batenberg
Tsar Ferdinand
Tsar Boris III
Emperor Alexander III of Russia
King Milan I of Serbia
King Carol I of Romania

The order was also awarded to:
The Samara flag
3rd Opalchenska company

The Republic Order

The order was reestablished after interruption of 57 years with a law by the 39th National Assembly of 29 May 2003 and published in State Gazette on 21 May 2004. In its contemporary form it has three grades without classes and is again with swords for military personnel and without swords for civilians.

See also
Orders, decorations, and medals of Bulgaria

Footnotes

External links
 Закон за ордените и медалите на Република България
 Военен орден „За храбростъ“

Military awards and decorations of Bulgaria
Orders of chivalry of Bulgaria
Awards established in 1880
Courage awards
1880 establishments in Bulgaria